Merianus was a legendary king of the Britons as accounted by Geoffrey of Monmouth.  He was preceded by Gurgintius and succeeded by Bledudo.

References

Legendary British kings
2nd-century BC rulers in Europe